= UMPG =

UMPG may refer to:

- Universal Music Publishing Group, a Vivendi subsidiary
- University of Maine at Portland-Gorham, an American post-secondary institution
